"What Good Can Drinkin' Do" is a blues song by Janis Joplin, the first song she ever recorded. 

The song has six verses, following the 12-bar blues pattern. Lyrics in the first and last verse are almost identical: "What good can drinkin' do ?" is sung twice, then answered with "Lord, I drink all night but the next day I still feel blue."

Recordings of this song can be heard on her 1975 album, Janis, or on the later box set Janis. Record Collector cites her intro to the song: Up steps a feisty young woman, one month short of her twentieth birthday. "Uh, this is a song called 'What Good Can Drinkin' Do', that I wrote one night after drinkin' myself into a stupor." ... 

In 2009, Austin musician Carolyn Wonderland began including the song in some of her live performances, after appearing at The American Music Masters tribute to Janis Joplin, "Kozmic Blues: The Life and Music of Janis Joplin."

References

Janis Joplin songs
1962 songs
Songs about alcohol
Song articles with missing songwriters